Alejandro Finisterre or Alexandre de Fisterra (born Alexandre Campos Ramírez; 6 May 1919 – 9 February 2007) is known as the inventor of futbolín, a Spanish variant of table football (aka foosball). He was also a poet, publisher and anarchist.

Biography
He was born Alexandre Campos Ramírez in 1919 to the radio-telegraphist at the lighthouse in Fisterra. He was injured when Franco's fascist forces bombed Madrid in November 1936 and had the idea for a football game while in Barcelona recovering. While convalescing in Montserrat, Barcelona he realized that he and his fellow wounded Republicans would never play football again and he had the idea for the table game. He patented his invention in Barcelona in 1937 and he also patented a foot-pedal that lets musicians turn the pages of their scores.

References

1919 births
2007 deaths
20th-century Spanish inventors
20th-century Spanish poets
Spanish anarchists
Spanish male poets
Spanish publishers (people)